Krokstadelva is a town in Drammen
municipality, part of the Viken
county in Norway. It is situated north of the Drammenselva river and opposite Mjøndalen.

Industry and commerce
Historically Krokstadelva was known for its industry; including paper & pulp production, forestry, technical-chemical manufacturing and apparel production. Today much of this industry has been phased out, and the local commerce has been given a boost in a large shopping mall located close to the town center; Buskerud Storsenter, formerly Spareland. The shopping mall is owned by CityCon, and have around 70 stores and 1200 parking spots.

Education
The town has four public schools, two primary schools (1st–7th grade) and two secondary schools (8th–10th grade). The largest primary school is Krokstad skole with about 540 students and the largest secondary school is Eknes skole with about 330 students. The Nedre Eiker Municipal Music school is also located in Krokstadelva, where about 105 students are engaged in extracurricular music education. There are two public preschools in Krokstadelva, with a total capacity of 165 children. The town also has seven private preschools.

Culture and sports activities
Krokstadelva features a combined sports hall and public indoor
swimming pool, situated next to Eknes skole. The local sports association is IF Birkebeineren (IBK) which
primarily focuses on football, crosscountry skiing, cycling and
tennis. The town also has a judo club, and there is ample opportunity for
hiking, crosscountry running and crosscountry skiing in the forest areas adjacent to the
town. There was previously a gymnasticsclub in IF Birkebeineren

References

External links
 Nedre Eiker Municipality website
 Eknes Sports hall and indoor swimmingpool
 Buskerud Storsenter shopping mall
 Krokstad Senter shopping mall
 Eknes Secondary school

Villages in Buskerud
Nedre Eiker